Hiram Bell (April 22, 1808 – December 21, 1855) was an American politician who was a U.S. Representative from the Ohio's Third Congressional District.

Bell was born in Salem (now Derby), Vermont, and attended the public schools of his native town. In 1826, his parents moved the family to Hamilton, Ohio. There he studied law and was admitted to the bar in 1829, when he commenced practice in Greenville, Ohio. Hiram Bell married Lusina Clark in Darke County on July 25, 1832; they had two children.

In 1829 and 1834 he was elected auditor of Darke County, Ohio.  He served three terms in the Ohio house of representatives in 1836, 1837, and 1840.

In 1850, he ran successfully for Congress as a Whig from the third district. After the redistricting following the 1850 census, he did not stand for re-election in the new district in 1852.

He engaged in the practice of law in Greenville where he died a few years later, aged 47. He is interred in the Greenville Cemetery.

Sources
 
 
 

1808 births
1855 deaths
People from Derby, Vermont
Whig Party members of the United States House of Representatives from Ohio
Members of the Ohio House of Representatives
People from Greenville, Ohio
People from Hamilton, Ohio
Members of the United States House of Representatives from Georgia (U.S. state)